Khwaja Hijran is a district in the Baghlan Province of Afghanistan.  The district was created in 2005 from part of Andarab District.  The name of the district has already been changed and its new one is Jalga.  It has a population of about 23,000 (52% male and 48% female), and its main village is Pansíri.

References

Districts of Baghlan Province
States and territories established in 2005